Sofpironium bromide (trade name Ecclock; development code BBI-4000) is a drug used to treat hyperhidrosis (excessive sweating).  It was approved in Japan in 2020 as a 5% gel for the treament of primary axillary hyperhidrosis (PAH).

Sofpironium bromide is an anticholinergic agent that reduces sweating by inhibiting M3 muscarinic receptors in eccrine glands.  It is a retrometabolically-designed drug (or "soft drug") based on glycopyrronium bromide, meaning it has been designed to exert the desired effects at the site of administration, after which it is quickly converted into an inactive non-toxic metabolite upon entering systemic circulation avoiding the typical anticholinergic side-effects caused by off-site action.

References 

Dermatologic drugs
Muscarinic antagonists
Quaternary ammonium compounds
Bromides
Pyrrolidines
Tertiary alcohols
Carboxylate esters